La hora de La 1 is a Spanish breakfast television news program, broadcast on weekdays on La 1 of Televisión Española from September 7, 2020.

Format 
La hora de La 1 is a magazine show broadcast live from Prado del Rey Studio 1, which addresses the daily news with content, organized by time slots, ranging from interviews and political debates to the social chronicle, through segments dedicated to economy, consumption, employment and housing; society, education, health, science, environment, events, human histories and public denunciation, and finally, culture and social chronicle. In addition, the show features live connections, spectator inquiries, and even comedy.

Political interview 
These are the political guest in the first week of the program

References

2020s Spanish television series
2020 Spanish television series debuts
Breakfast television
RTVE shows